Meriem Bidani (born 7 July 1972) is a Moroccan taekwondo practitioner.

She competed at the 2000 Summer Olympics in Sydney. She won a gold medal at the 1996 African Taekwondo Championships in Johannesburg.

References

External links

1972 births
Living people
Moroccan female taekwondo practitioners
Olympic taekwondo practitioners of Morocco
Taekwondo practitioners at the 2000 Summer Olympics
African Taekwondo Championships medalists
20th-century Moroccan women
21st-century Moroccan women